The 12445 / 12446 Uttar Sampark Kranti Express is a Sampark Kranti Express train which connects New Delhi railway station to Shri Mata Vaishno Devi Katra railway station. The train runs daily via Jammu Tawi, Jalandhar Cantonment, Ludhiana, Ambala, Panipat and Udhampur, covering a distance of 655 km at an average speed of 57 km/hr.

History 
The train was flagged off from Udhampur by Prime Minister Shri Manmohan Singh on 14 April 2005 on Jammu Udhampur rail link as a part of Jammu–Udhampur–Baramulla rail project. The then railway minister Shri Lalu Prasad Yadav was also there. The foundation stone for this project was laid in 1983 by then Prime Minister Smt. Indira Gandhi on a rainy day in Udhampur. The train originally ran  3 days a week between new  and Udhampur. In 2006 its frequency was increased to 6 days a week and in 2009 its frequency was increased to daily. It was extended to Shri Mata Vaishno Devi Katra railway station w.e.f 01.09.2015. The train now connects Shri Mata Vaishno Devi Katra railway station to the rest of the country in the first phase of a project that will provide a rail link to the Kashmir Valley.
14033/34 Jammu Mail running between Old Delhi to Udhampur has also been extended to Shri Mata Vaishno Devi Katra railway station.
  
The train numbered 12445 departs New Delhi at 20:50 IST and arrives Shri Mata Vaishno Devi Katra railway station at 08:40 IST. In the return direction, the train numbered 12446 departs from Shri Mata Vaishno Devi Katra railway station at 19:10 IST and arrives New Delhi at 06:10 IST.

Coach composition

LOCO-SLR-GEN-GEN-H1-A1-B5 -B4-B3-B2-B1-S12-S11-S10-S9-S8-S7-S6-S5-S4-S3-S2-S1-GEN-GEN-SLR.

Route & halts

Locomotive 
It is hauled by a Ghaziabad-based WAP-7 locomotive from end to end.

Pantry/Catering 
Catering available in the train but no pantry car services.

Gallery

References 

 India Rail Info
 Indian Railways

Transport in Katra, Jammu and Kashmir
Transport in Delhi
Sampark Kranti Express trains
Rail transport in Delhi
Rail transport in Haryana
Rail transport in Punjab, India
Rail transport in Jammu and Kashmir
Railway services introduced in 2005